Prince Gyeongchunwon (d. 960) was a Korean Royal Prince as the only son of Jeongjong of Goryeo, from Queen Munseong, also the nephew of Gwangjong of Goryeo. Upon the death of his father on April 13th 949, he was unable to succeed the throne due to his young age at the time. His uncle, King Gwangjong, succeeded in line to be the king and he was later executed by Gwangjong along with his half cousin Prince Heunghwa.

In popular culture
Portrayed by Kim Min-woo and Sung Nak-man in the 2002–2003 KBS TV series The Dawn of the Empire.

References

Korean princes
Year of birth unknown
960 deaths
10th-century Korean people